Akreijit is a town situated in central Mauritania.

Populated places in Mauritania